The current Silver Spurs Arena is an 8,000-seat (11,500 seat max capacity), 33,946 square foot multi-purpose arena, in Kissimmee, Florida. It was built in 2003. It replaced the original Silver Spurs grand stand. Both are home to the Silver Spurs Rodeo a semi-annual rodeo event. Concerts, family shows, school  graduations, and sporting events are also held there. The arena, part of the Osceola Heritage Park entertainment complex, features 12 luxury suites, four locker rooms and additional amenities.

The arena was home to the Florida Seals of the Southern Professional Hockey League from October 2005 until January 4, 2007. During the 2005 season, it was home to the Kissimmee Kreatures of the National Indoor Football League. During 2006, the team was to be known as the Osceola Outlaws but then changed their name to Osceola Football as another team in the NIFL located in Billings, Montana held that nickname. For the 2007 season the team changed its nickname to Osceola Ghostriders and played in the World Indoor Football League.  Since 2018, it serves as the home of the Orlando SeaWolves of the Major Arena Soccer League.

References

External links
 Silver Spurs Arena

Indoor arenas in Florida
Indoor ice hockey venues in Florida
Convention centers in Florida
Music venues in Florida
Sports venues in Greater Orlando
Buildings and structures in Kissimmee, Florida
Tourist attractions in Osceola County, Florida
2003 establishments in Florida
Sports venues completed in 2003
Rodeo venues in the United States
Indoor soccer venues in the United States
Orlando SeaWolves